The Roman Catholic Diocese of Aizawl is a diocese located in the city of Aizawl in the Ecclesiastical province of Shillong in India.

History
 17 January 1952: Established as Apostolic Prefecture of Haflong from the Metropolitan Archdiocese of Dacca
 26 June 1969: Promoted as Diocese of Silchar
 11 January 1996: Renamed as Diocese of Aizawl

Leadership
 Bishops of Aizawl (Latin Rite)
 Bishop Stephen Rotluanga, C.S.C. (2 October 2001 – present)
 Apostolic Administrator - Bishop Lumen Monteiro (2000-2001)
 Bishop Denzil Reginald D’Souza (11 January 1996 – 18 October 2000)
 Bishops of Silchar (Latin Rite) 
 Bishop Denzil Reginald D’Souza (26 June 1969 – 11 January 1996)
 Prefect Apostolic of Haflong (Roman Rite) 
 Fr. George Daniel Breen, C.S.C. (21 March 1952 – 1969)

See also
 List of Christian denominations in North East India
 List of Roman Catholic dioceses in India

References

External links
 GCatholic.org 
 Catholic Hierarchy 

Roman Catholic dioceses in India
Christianity in Mizoram
Churches in Mizoram
Diocese
Diocese
Roman Catholic dioceses and prelatures established in the 20th century
Diocese